The boxing tournaments at the 2020 Summer Olympics in Tokyo took place from 24 July to 8 August 2021 at the Ryōgoku Kokugikan. Thirteen events were staged, the same number as in London in 2012 and Rio de Janeiro in 2016. However, for the first time since the London Games, the programme has been updated, with the number of men's events reduced by two and the number of women's events increased by the same number.

On 22 May 2019, the International Olympic Committee (IOC) announced that the International Boxing Association (AIBA) had been stripped of the right to organise the tournament, due to "issues in the areas of finance, governance, ethics and refereeing and judging". Boxing will instead be organised by an ad-hoc task force led by Morinari Watanabe, president of the International Gymnastics Federation.

Competition format
On March 23, 2013, the AIBA instituted significant changes to the format. The World Series of Boxing, AIBA's pro team league which started in 2010, already enabled team members to retain 2012 Olympic eligibility. The newer AIBA Pro Boxing Tournament, consisting of pros who sign 5 year contracts with AIBA and compete on pro cards leading up to the tournament, also provides a pathway for new pros to retain their Olympic eligibility and retain ties with national committees. The elimination of headgear and the adoption of the "10-point must" scoring system further clears the delineation between amateur and pro format.

The number of weight classes for men was reduced from ten to eight, with a featherweight class introduced and events at light-flyweight (introduced in 1968), bantamweight (staged at every Olympics since 1904 bar 1912, when boxing events weren't held) and light-welterweight (introduced in 1952) removed. The women's weight classes saw a corresponding increase from three to five, with featherweight and welterweight categories introduced.

The IOC confirmed weight limits for all 13 classes on 19 June 2019.

Men contested matches in these eight weight classes:

Lightweight (63 kg)

Women contested matches in these five weight classes:

Qualifying criteria

Each National Olympic Committee was permitted to enter up to one athlete in each event. Six places (four men and two women) were reserved for the host nation Japan, while eight further places (five men and three women) were allocated to the Tripartite Invitation Commission.

All other places were allocated through four Continental Olympic Qualification Events (one each for Africa, the Americas, Asia/Oceania and Europe) between January 2020 and June 2021. The COVID-19 pandemic delayed several events for the boxing including impacting the first 3 days of the European Qualification Event. The Americas Qualification Event and World Olympic Qualification Event were then cancelled in 2021.

Participating nations

Competition schedule

Medal summary

Medal table

Men

Women

See also
Boxing at the 2018 Asian Games
Boxing at the 2018 Summer Youth Olympics
Boxing at the 2019 Pan American Games

References

External links
 Results book 

 
2020
2020 Summer Olympics events
Olympics
Boxing competitions in Japan